David Otaris dze Lordkipanidze (Georgian: დავით ლორთქიფანიძე) (born 5 August 1964, in Tbilisi) is a Georgian anthropologist and archaeologist, Professor (2004), Dr.Sc. (2002), Corresponding Member of the Georgian National Academy of Sciences (2009), since 2004 General Director of the Georgian National Museum (GNM). He is a son of the archaeologist Otar Lordkipanidze.

David Lordkipanidze is best known for his discovery of the hominin fossil, first named Homo georgicus, but later reclassified as Homo erectus. Conducting excavation at Dmanisi in Georgia, he found skulls of an early hominin thought to be a precursor of Homo erectus. Subsequently, four fossil skeletons were found, showing a species still with primitive features in its skull and upper body but with relatively advanced spines and lower limbs, providing greater mobility. They represent a stage soon after the transition from Homo habilis to Homo erectus, and have been dated at 1.8 million years before the present.

Lordkipanidze has received many awards, including the Georgia's Order of Honour (2000), Award of the Prince of Monaco (2001), the French Order of "Palmes Academiques" (2002), the Rolex Award for Enterprise (2004), the French Order of Honour (2006) and the Goethe Medal (2016).

He was appointed Director General of the Georgian National Museum (GNM) in 2004. In 2007 he became both a Foreign Member of the United States National Academy of Sciences and a Fellow of the World Academy of Art and Science (U.S.).

References

External links 

Georgian National Museum (GNM)
David Lordkipanidze: Biographical sketch.

Anthropologists from Georgia (country)
1963 births
Living people
Archaeologists from Tbilisi
Academic staff of Tbilisi State University
Foreign associates of the National Academy of Sciences